Toili is a district in the Banggai Regency of Central Sulawesi, Indonesia. It is a largely agricultural area with palm oil plantations, gold mining, and gas and petroleum production. Transmigration policies have brought people from Java and the Lesser Sunda Islands.

banggai Regency
Districts of Central Sulawesi